National Poverty Eradication Programme (NAPEP) is a 2001 program by the Nigerian government addressing poverty in Nigeria and related issues. It was designed to replace the Poverty Alleviation Program.

Background
Poverty in Nigeria remains significant despite high economic growth. Nigeria has one of the world's highest economic growth rates (averaging 7.4% over the last decade), a well-developed economy, and plenty of natural resources such as oil. However, it retains a high level of poverty, with 41% of the population classified as poor by the National Bureau of Statistics in 2019 (63% were living on less than $1 per day back in 2001). There have been governmental attempts at poverty alleviation, of which the National Poverty Eradication Programme (NAPEP) and National Poverty Eradication Council (NAPEC) are the most recent ones.

NAPEP
National Poverty Eradication Programme (NAPEP) is a 2001 program by the Nigerian government aiming at poverty reduction, in particular, reduction of absolute poverty. It was designed to replace the Poverty Alleviation Program. NAPEP and NAPEC coordinate and oversee various other institutions, including ministries, and develop plans and guidelines for them to follow with regards to poverty reduction. NAPEP goals include training youths in vocational trades, to support internship, to support micro-credit, create employment in the automobile industry, and help VVF patients.

The program is seen as an improvement over the previous Nigerian government poverty-reduction programmes. According to a 2008 analysis, the program has been able to train 130,000 youths and engaged 216,000 people
, but most of the beneficiaries were non-poor.

Incidents
Several concerns over corruption have been raised.

In late May 2011, the program website was targeted by Nigerian hacktivists during the inauguration of Goodluck Jonathan.

References

Further reading

External links
Official homepage
THE NATIONAL POVERTY ERADICATION PROGRAMME (NAPEP). MONITORING STRATEGIES. PAPER PRESENTED AT THE COMMUNITY BASED MONITORING AND EVALUATION METHODOLOGY WORKSHOP BY DR UMAR B. BINDIR DIRECTOR (MONITORING & MANAGEMENT INFORMATION SERVICES). 2002

2001 establishments in Nigeria
Poverty in Nigeria
Poverty-related organizations